Ivan de Prume is a heavy metal drummer whose music became famous in the groove metal band White Zombie.

DePrume was born in Brooklyn, New York City. His great-great-grandfather was Frantz Jehin-Prume. He started playing drums when he was twelve and was playing in a band with Sean Yseult when he was sixteen. Sean later invited him to join White Zombie. Ivan recorded and toured with the band for seven years. Ivan left the band in 1992.  He attended Musician's Institute and completed their Drums and Percussion program.  He also built his first professional recording studio in Los Angeles, Burningsound and began recording, producing and engineering projects.  His studio recorded L7 and Paul Raven and Tommy Victor of Prong.

He also made a cameo appearance on the Jack Off Jill album "Covetous Creature" along with former Marilyn Manson guitarist Scott Putesky.

In 2003, de Prume formed a new band, Healer, along with Scott von Heldt (Kurai/Theater of Madness).  The band's debut album, Awakening features violinist Martin St-Pierre (Cirque du Soleil), and vocalist Kate St-Pierre (Los Angeles Opera).  The album was recorded and engineered at Burningsound Studios and Ivan also produced the record.

In 2006, Ivan was asked to play drums on the soundtrack for Sony's Ghost Rider by Christopher Young.

In 2007, Ivan and his family relocated to the Pacific Northwest. Burningsound Studios officially re-opened for business in January 2009.

In March 2009 Ivan began hosting a weekly metal radio show on Saturday nights called Metalopolis in Portland, Oregon for 101.1 KUFO.

In 2010, Ivan completed a remix for "Never Say Never" by KMFDM on 13th Planet Records.  The album features remixes by guest artists like Tommy Victor and other notable artists as well.

References

External links
 http://www.ivandeprume.com Official Web Page 
 https://www.facebook.com/ivandeprume
 https://twitter.com/ivandeprume
 http://www.linkedin.com/in/ivandeprume
 http://www.myspace.com/ivandeprume

De Prume, Ivan
De Prume, Ivan
American people of French-Canadian descent
De Prume, Ivan
Year of birth missing (living people)